Rubrouck (once Ruysbroeck) is a commune in the Nord department in northern France.

History
Rubrouck was first mentioned in 1104.  It was the home of the 13th century explorer William of Rubruck (fl.1248–1255).

Heraldry

See also
Communes of the Nord department

References

Communes of Nord (French department)
French Flanders